Lucas Gabriel Di Yorio (born 22 November 1996) is an Argentine professional footballer who plays as a forward for Liga MX club León on loan from Pachuca.

Career
Di Yorio's youth career started at the age of four when he joined the ranks at Talleres, he remained with them until 2010 when he moved to join Kimberley's youth team. A further five years later he departed to join Argentine Primera División club Aldosivi's reserves. He was promoted into Aldosivi's first-team a year later in 2016 and made his debut on 10 April against Racing Club, he played thirty-four minutes and picked up a card in the process. One more league appearance and one in the Copa Argentina followed for Di Yorio in 2016. He didn't make a first-team appearance in 2016–17 as Aldosivi were relegated to the second tier.

On 6 March 2019, Di Yorio signed for Ecuadorian Serie B side L.D.U. Portoviejo on loan. He scored his first senior goal with the club, converting a penalty in a 1–0 win over Independiente Juniors on 6 April. Di Yorio netted a hat-trick over Clan Juvenil on 17 August.

Career statistics
.

Honours
Aldosivi
Primera B Nacional: 2017–18

References

External links

1996 births
Living people
Sportspeople from Mar del Plata
Argentine footballers
Association football forwards
Argentine expatriate footballers
Aldosivi footballers
L.D.U. Portoviejo footballers
Cerro Largo F.C. players
C.F. Pachuca players
Everton de Viña del Mar footballers
Club León footballers
Argentine Primera División players
Primera Nacional players
Ecuadorian Serie B players
Uruguayan Primera División players
Chilean Primera División players
Liga MX players
Expatriate footballers in Ecuador
Argentine expatriate sportspeople in Ecuador
Expatriate footballers in Uruguay
Argentine expatriate sportspeople in Uruguay
Expatriate footballers in Chile
Argentine expatriate sportspeople in Chile
Expatriate footballers in Mexico
Argentine expatriate sportspeople in Mexico